Chen Peina (born 19 June 1989 in Shantou, Guangdong) is a Chinese competitive sailor.

She competed at the 2016 Summer Olympics in Rio de Janeiro, where she won a silver medal in the women's RS:X.

References

External links
 
 

1989 births
Living people
Chinese windsurfers
Female windsurfers
Chinese female sailors (sport)
Olympic sailors of China
Olympic medalists in sailing
Sailors at the 2016 Summer Olympics – RS:X
2016 Olympic silver medalists for China
Universiade gold medalists for China
Universiade medalists in sailing
Medalists at the 2011 Summer Universiade
Asian Games gold medalists for China
Asian Games medalists in sailing
Sailors at the 2018 Asian Games
Medalists at the 2018 Asian Games
RS:X class world champions
21st-century Chinese women